Dueñas, officially the Municipality of Dueñas, is a 4th class municipality in the province of Iloilo, Philippines. According to the 2020 census, it has a population of 34,597 people.

Dueñas river Jalaur is known for its first class quality of sand and gravel and became the quarry capital of Western Visayas.

History
Dueñas had its foundation and Christianization in 1590 with the name of Sumandig.  In 1599, it was moved to Sibucao. Four years later (1603) she was joined to Dumangas and two years later in 1605 she enjoyed her independence.

In 1608, she was transferred to Laglag, now Barangay Pader, Dueñas, and remained in this place for 59 years or until 1667. It had only five barrios, namely: Sibucao and Sumandig in the lowlands; and Misi, Camantugan and Malonor in the upland.

In 1668, Laglag was joined to Passi, only to be separated a year after (1669). From 1669 to 1844 or for a period of 175 years, Laglag still remained in the said site. (This was for reason that most of the family name of the residents of Dueñas begin with letter “L” ). But later in 1845, Laglag was moved around four kilometers eastward and given a name Dueñas in memory of the birthplace (Dueñas, Palencia, Spain) of Fr. Florencio Martin, who authored the transfer. Saint Jerome, Doctor of the Church, is the Patron Saint of Dueñas.

The word “Dueñas” or “Dueña” is derived from a Latin word domna or domina, which means landlady or madam who has dominion over a certain house or estate.

Urban legend
Dueñas has been known to be the site of the infamous "Teniente Gimo" urban legend story. Teniente is a Spanish word for lieutenant since according to the story, a guy named Gimo was the Teniente del Barrio, or what is now known as the Barangay Chairman of the place. The story revolves about Gimo's family of aswangs wherein one of her daughters invited two of her female classmates from Iloilo City to their barrio fiesta without any knowledge of them being aswangs. Story says that Gimo and company mistakenly slaughtered his daughter while asleep instead of the targeted guest after that one guest herself overheard them of their plan to manslaughter her and feast for her body. As a result, the girl tricked the aswangs into killing their own kind and escaped, while the fate of the other classmate was unknown.

The story has still been considered unproven and remains arguably the most famous aswang'' story of all time. Sources state that the whole story and characters were all fictional and is a product of old native literature by the elderly Ilonggo people. The story is often told by adults, both young and old, to scare off disobedient children. It has even been referenced to in popular culture specifically in a few Philippine horror films and is also widespread outside Iloilo and the rest of Panay, with various versions of the tale.

Geography

Barangays
Dueñas is politically subdivided into 47 barangays.

Climate

Demographics

Economy

Government
As of 2018, there have been around 75 town executives who served Dueñas (from old name - Laglag to present name - Dueñas).

Elected officials
 Mayor: Mamerto L.Pelopero III
 Vice Mayor: Robert Martin U. Pama
 Congressman: Braeden John Q. Biron
 Councilors:
 Lumayno, Reneo
 La-ab, Francis L
 Sorongon, Edwin A.
 Pedregosa, Santiago
 Olano, Delbe
 Catalan, Stephen M.
 Lamasan, Rey E.
 Acullador, Jose

Notable personalities

 Nazaria Lagos-The Florence Nightingale Of Panay and she was the nurse during the Philippine Revolution and Philippine-American War.

References

External links
 [ Philippine Standard Geographic Code]
 Philippine Census Information
 Local Governance Performance Management System
 Official website of Dueñas government

Municipalities of Iloilo